Boffa is a prefecture located in the Boké Region of Guinea. The capital is Boffa.

Sub-prefectures
The prefecture is divided administratively into 8 sub-prefectures:
 Boffa-Centre
 Colia
 Douprou
 Koba-Tatema
 Lisso
 Mankountan
 Tamita
 Tougnifili

References

Prefectures of Guinea
Boké Region